Gonzalo de la Fuente de la Iglesia (born 21 March 1984), sometimes known simply as Gonzalo, is a Spanish footballer who plays for UP Langreo. Mainly a central defender, he can also play as a right back or defensive midfielder.

Club career
Born in Burgos, Castile and León, de la Fuente made his debuts as a senior with lowly Peña Antonio José in 2003, moving to Segunda División B club Burgos CF a year later. On 15 July 2008, he moved to Real Oviedo also in the third level.

In July 2011, de la Fuente returned to Burgos, appearing regularly but suffering relegation. He continued to compete in division three in the following seasons, representing Caudal Deportivo and Real Avilés.

On 21 August 2014, de la Fuente signed a one-year deal with Albacete Balompié, freshly promoted to Segunda División. Nine days later, aged 30, he played his first match as a professional, starting in a 1–1 away draw against CD Tenerife.

De la Fuente scored his first professional goal on 3 May 2015, netting the first in a 2–1 home win against FC Barcelona B.

References

External links

1984 births
Living people
Sportspeople from Burgos
Spanish footballers
Footballers from Castile and León
Association football defenders
Segunda División players
Segunda División B players
Tercera División players
Burgos CF footballers
Real Oviedo players
Caudal Deportivo footballers
Real Avilés CF footballers
Albacete Balompié players
SD Ponferradina players
Racing de Santander players
UD Ibiza players
UP Langreo footballers